Chastina Rix (1881–1963), later known as Christine Sterling, was born in Oakland, 
California. Her most notable works were as a preservationist who helped save the Avila Adobe and created Olvera Street in Los Angeles. She also helped create China City.

"The booklets and folders I read about Los Angeles were painted in colors of Spanish-Mexican romance,...They were appealing with old missions, palm trees, sunshine and the ‘click of the castanets.’"— Christine Sterling, journal

Early life

Christine Sterling was born Chastina Rix in Oakland, Alameda County, California on 5 November 1881, one of four children of Edward Austin Rix and Kate Elizabeth Kiteridge. Her father, was a mining engineer via UC Berkeley (Zeta Psi) and inventor of the "Rix Rock Drill", later, vineyard planter born to Chastina Walbridge Rix and Alfred Stevens Rix (1822-1904), a San Francisco Committee of Vigilance leading member and a San Francisco justice of the peace, from New Hampshire, and Vermont, left for the gold fields California in 1852, married Chastina Walbridge in 1849, at Vermont, later married Margaret Arabella Tuite in 1858, at California. 

Chastina, changed her name to Christine, as a teenager, and briefly studied art and design at Mills College in Oakland. After a brief first marriage, she married Jerome Hough, an attorney, having two children, June, and Peter in 1915, then moving to Hollywood for his film industry work. By 1920 the family was living on Bonnie Brae Street near downtown Los Angeles. Hough abandoned the family and soon died, from a stroke, leaving Christine a widow without means. 

"At last Los Angeles was home, The sunshine, mountains, beaches, palm trees were here, but where was the romance of the past?" — Christine Sterling, journal

By 1928, she had changed her last name to Sterling.

Life and Work  
"I closed my eyes and thought of the Plaza as a Spanish-American social and commercial center, a spot of beauty as a gesture of appreciation to México and Spain for our historical past." — Christine Sterling, 1933 booklet

Her explorations of the city led to her discovery of the decrepit Avila Adobe, which she later went on to preserve. Olvera Street opened to the public on Easter Sunday 1930.

"It might be well to take our Mexican population seriously and allow them to put a little of the romance and picturesque into our city which we so freely advertise ourselves as possessing. The plaza should be converted into a social and commercial Latin American center." — Christine Sterling

Death
Sterling lived in Chavez Ravine from 1938 to May 9, 1959, when the city began evicting residents for Dodger Stadium. Sterling moved into the Avila Adobe, where she died, at age 82, in 1963.

Bibliography
 Christine Sterling. Olvera Street, Its history and restoration 1933.
 Christine Sterling, June Sterling Park Olvera Street : El Pueblo De Nuestra Senora La Reina De Los Angeles : Its history and Restoration and The Life Story of Christine Sterling By Her Daughter 1947.
 Lynn A. Bonfield, New England to Gold Rush California: The Journal of Alfred and Chastina W. Rix, 1849-1854. Arthur H. Clark Co., Univ. of Oklahoma Press, 2011.
 Daily Journal of Alfred and Chastina W. Rix July 1849-May 1857
 Chastina W. Rix, Journal of My Journey to California, Peacham, Vt. 1853

References

External links 
 https://www.findagrave.com/memorial/116176325/christine-sterling

1881 births
1963 deaths
People from Oakland, California